This is a list of things named after Pythagoras, the ancient Greek philosopher, mystic, mathematician, and music theorist.

Philosophy and mysticism 
 Pythagoreanism – the system of philosophy of Pythagoras and his followers
 Neopythagoreanism – a later philosophical system
 Pythagorean cup – a drinking cup that forces its user to imbibe only in moderation
 Pythagorean letter – the Greek letter upsilon, used as a symbol by the Pythagoreans
 Pythagorean diet – vegetarianism
 Pythagorean symbol – the tetractys
 Pythagorean system – the distinctive system of numerology used by the Pythagoreans

Mathematics 

 Pythagorean theorem – the statement that the sum of the areas of the squares on the sides of a right triangle is the area of the square on the hypotenuse
 Pythagorean triple – a set of three positive integers that can occur in the Pythagorean theorem
 Pythagorean quadruple - a set of four positive integers that describes the space diagonal of a cuboid. Also known as a Pythagorean box.
 Pythagorean expectation – a method of statistical analysis inspired by the Pythagorean theorem
 Pythagorean field – in algebra, a field in which the sum of two squares is in every case itself a square
 Pythagorean prime – a prime number of the form 4n + 1
 Pythagorean trigonometric identity – any of several trigonometric identities
 Pythagorean means – the arithmetic mean, the geometric mean, and the harmonic mean
 Pythagorean addition – an arithmetic operation arising from the Pythagorean theorem
 Pythagoras's constant – the square root of 2
 Lute of Pythagoras – a geometric figure
 Pythagoras tree – a fractal geometric figure
 Table of Pythagoras, another name for the Multiplication table

Music 

 Pythagorean comma
 Pythagorean tuning
 Pythagorean hammers
 Pythagorean interval

Other 
 Pythagoras' Cave, where Pythagoras is said to have hidden from the tyrant Polycrates on Mount Kerkis on Samos
 Pythagoreion, a town on Samos
 Pythagoras (crater) – a lunar crater
 PythagoraSwitch – a Japanese educational TV program, which also features sequences showing . Pythagorean Devices are known in the US as "Rube Goldberg machines", or in Great Britain as "Heath Robinson" contraptions.
 Pythagoras Mechanical Workshop Museum – a building—a former factory—in Sweden
 School of Pythagoras – the oldest building in St John's College, Cambridge
 Pythagoras ABM – an agent-based software model
 Knights of Pythagoras – a Masonic body for boys

Pythagoras
Pythagoras